Kabange Mupopo (born 21 September 1992) is a Zambian sprinter and football player, who won a gold in the 400m at the 2015 All-Africa Games.

Biography
Mupopo started playing association football as an 11-year-old, inspired by her brother. She played for Green Buffaloes F.C. and the Zambia women's national football team; as team captain, she led Zambia to the 2014 African Women's Championship tournament, where they were eliminated in the group stage.

Mupopo picked up athletics in the spring of 2014, running 53.44 for 400 metres in her first official meeting. She represented Zambia at the 2014 Commonwealth Games in Glasgow, where she ran 53.09 and was eliminated in the semi-finals. In August, she took silver in 51.21 at the African Championships in Marrakech, breaking the Zambian record; she lost the gold to Nigeria's Folashade Abugan, who ran the same time, in a photo-finish. Mupopo qualified to represent Africa at the 2014 IAAF Continental Cup, also in Marrakech, where she placed fourth and improved her national record to 50.87. Mupopo received an 18-month athletics scholarship from the Zambian Olympic Committee in 2015, leading her to concentrate on athletics and not football.

Mupopo debuted in the IAAF Diamond League in Doha in May 2015, placing seventh in 51.88. In July 2015 she ran 50.86 in La Chaux-de-Fonds, improving her national record by one-hundredth of a second. She was selected for the 2015 World Championships in Beijing.

References

External links

1992 births
Living people
Zambian female sprinters
Zambian women's footballers
Zambia women's international footballers
Commonwealth Games competitors for Zambia
Athletes (track and field) at the 2014 Commonwealth Games
World Athletics Championships athletes for Zambia
Athletes (track and field) at the 2016 Summer Olympics
Olympic athletes of Zambia
African Games gold medalists for Zambia
African Games medalists in athletics (track and field)
Women's association football midfielders
Sportspeople from Lusaka
Athletes (track and field) at the 2015 African Games
Olympic female sprinters